The Church of Saint Colman (in Irish: Eaglais Naomh Cólman) is a Roman Catholic parish church in the parish of Claremorris and Barnacarroll, in Ireland. It designed in Early English Gothic style by R. M. Butler, and it was built in 1911. It is located in the centre of Claremorris, Co. Mayo, Ireland.

Barnacarroll 
This church is located between Knock and Claremorris, in a high-up, remote location. Mass is celebrated there at 9.30am every Sunday by the same priest as Claremorris.

In the gallery, there is a Viscount cadet organ, which is played every Sunday by William Smyth.

The Organ

The organ is a two manual Telford, and it has approximately 1,000 pipes of metal and wood. The organ is divided into two parts at the back gallery of the church.

Specification

Great 

Double Diapason 16'

Open Diapason 8'

Rohr flute 8'

Principle 4'

Wald flute 4'

Fifteenth 2'

Swell to Great

Swell octave to Great

Swell suboctave to Great

Swell 

Violone Diapason 8'

Echo Gamba 8'

Vox clesete 8'

Principle 4'

Saub flute 4'

Comerone 8'

Swell sub-octave

Swell octave

Pedal 

Subbass 32'

Wood Diapason 16'

Bourdon 16'

Octave 8'

Swell to Pedal

Great to Pedal

References

Roman Catholic churches in County Mayo
Roman Catholic churches completed in 1911
1911 establishments in Ireland
20th-century Roman Catholic church buildings in Ireland
Roman Catholic Archdiocese of Tuam
20th-century churches in the Republic of Ireland